Frank Stewart "Mickey" McGuire (July 7, 1898 – May 23, 1968) was a Canadian professional ice hockey forward who played 36 games in the National Hockey League for the Pittsburgh Pirates. He was born in Gravenhurst, Ontario.

After retiring from hockey, McGuire became a competitive bowler, residing in Windsor, Ontario. He also worked for Chrysler. He died in 1968 after a long illness at a hospital in Windsor, Ontario.

Career statistics

Regular season and playoffs

References

External links

1898 births
1968 deaths
Canadian expatriate ice hockey players in the United States
Canadian ice hockey forwards
Central Hockey League (1925–1926) players
Cleveland Hockey Club ice hockey players
Cleveland Indians (IHL) players
Ice hockey people from Ontario
London Panthers players
People from Gravenhurst, Ontario
Pittsburgh Pirates (NHL) players
Pittsburgh Yellow Jackets (IHL) players
Windsor Bulldogs (CPHL) players